Colloid and Polymer Science is a peer-reviewed scientific journal which publishes in the field of colloid and polymer science and its interdisciplinary interactions. The journal is published by Springer Science+Business Media. It was first published in 1906.

Impact factor 
Colloid and Polymer Science had a 2021 impact factor of 2.434.

Editors 
The editors in chief of the journal are C.M. Papadakis (TU Munich) and A. Schmidt (U Köln), and chief advisory editor is 
F. Kremer (University Leipzig).

External links

References 

Chemistry journals
Publications established in 1906
Springer Science+Business Media academic journals
English-language journals
Monthly journals